Max Mirnyi and Andy Ram were the defending champions. Both were present, but chose not to compete together this year.
Ram partnered with Michaël Llodra, but they lost to Feliciano López and Fernando Verdasco in the first round.
Mirnyi partnered with Mahesh Bhupathi, reaching the final, where they were defeated by Lukáš Dlouhý and Leander Paes (6–2, 7–5).

Seeds

Draw

Finals

Top half

Bottom half

External links
Main Draw

2010 ATP World Tour
2010 Sony Ericsson Open
Men in Florida